Dale Brown (born 1956) is an American novelist.

Dale Brown may also refer to:
Dale Brown (basketball) (born 1935), American basketball coach
Dale Brown (boxer) (born 1971), Canadian boxer